Michael G. Rascher (born 26 July 1965 in Edmonton, Alberta) is a retired rower from Canada. He competed at the 1992 Summer Olympics for his native country. There he was a member of the team that won the gold medal in the men's Eights.

References
 Canadian Olympic Committee
 

1965 births
Living people
Canadian male rowers
Olympic gold medalists for Canada
Olympic medalists in rowing
Olympic rowers of Canada
Rowers at the 1992 Summer Olympics
Sportspeople from Edmonton
Medalists at the 1992 Summer Olympics
Pan American Games medalists in rowing
Pan American Games bronze medalists for Canada
Rowers at the 1987 Pan American Games